Diane Grayson (born Diane Guinibert in 1948 in London, England) is an English actress.

She played "Jenny", probably her best known role, in The Prime of Miss Jean Brodie (1969) and "Janie Harker" in Emmerdale. Her earliest television role was as "Penny Richardson" (niece of motel owner "Meg Richardson", played by Noele Gordon) in the early years of Crossroads. She also played Sandy Rexton in See No Evil (1971).

References

External links
 

English film actresses
Living people
Actresses from London
1948 births